Joseph William Walker, OAM  is an Australian swimmer with an intellectual disability. At the 1992 Paralympic Games for Persons with Mental Handicap, he won nine gold medals from nine events.

Career

Walker started his swimming career with Eric Arnold's BHP Hunter Swim Club in the Newcastle, New South Wales area.  He started training seriously at the age of 15.

At the 1992 Paralympic Games for Persons with Mental Handicap in Madrid, Spain, he won nine gold medals in the Men's 100 m Freestyle, Men's 200 m Freestyle, Men's 400 m Freestyle, Men's 50 m Butterfly, Men's 100 m Butterfly, Men's 4 x 50 m Freestyle Relay, Men's 4 × 100 m Freestyle Relay, Men's 4 x 50 m Medley Relay and Men's 4 × 100 m Medley Relay.
He broke two individual world records - Men's 100 m Freestyle and Men's 100 m butterfly. 
This performance was unmatched in Australian Olympic and Paralympic history at the time. After the Games, he was awarded an Australian Institute of Sport Athletes with a Disability scholarship.

At the 1994 IPC Swimming World Championships, Valletta, Malta, he won two gold medals in Men's 100 m Freestyle S14 and Men's 50 m Butterfly S14, two silver medals in Men's 100 m Breaststroke SB14 and Men's 50 m Freestyle S14 and bronze medal in the Men's 50 m Backstroke S14.

He was not selected for the 1996 Atlanta Paralympics and took up basketball. He represented New South Wales for many years and represented Australia at the 2003 Special Olympics World Summer Games in Dublin, Ireland where his team took out the Silver Medal.

Recognition

1993 - OAM for service to sport as a gold medallist at the Madrid 1992 Paralympic Games.
2000 - 2000 Sydney Paralympics Torch Relay
 Hunter Region Sporting Hall of Fame

References

1971 births
Sportspeople from Newcastle, New South Wales
Australian male backstroke swimmers
Australian male butterfly swimmers
Intellectual Disability category Paralympic competitors
Australian Institute of Sport Paralympic swimmers
Recipients of the Medal of the Order of Australia
Living people
Competitors in athletics with intellectual disability